Team Durango was a manufacturer and distributor of radio-controlled cars and accessories.

History
The original Durango was developed by Serpent Racing from the Netherlands who teamed up with Gerd Strenge to develop a Serpent-Branded 4WD electric buggy based upon prototype cars designs and built by German racer Gerd Strenge, calling the car the S500.  The car was a radical departure from the slab-sided hand-machined prototypes when it first saw the light of day at Nuremberg 2008 however the economic climate meant the car never went into production. Fortunately Gerd Strenge and his designer Michael Vollmer formed at the end of 2008 the brand ‘Team Durango’, launching a redesigned S500 called the DEX410 and making it available to the mass market since September 2009. For many years before then prototype cars designed and built by Gerd had noticeable success against the larger commercial builders on the European racing scene.

The then owners Hobbico discontinued the product in 2017.

Racing

Podiums at World Championships

Podiums at National Championships

Products

1/10 Scale 4WD Electric Onroad Competition Touring Car

1/10 Scale 2WD Electric Offroad Competition Buggy

DEX210F

1/10 Scale 4WD Electric Offroad Competition Buggy

1/10 Scale 4WD Electric Offroad Truck

1/8 Scale 4WD Electric Offroad Competition Buggy

1/8 Scale 4WD Nitro Offroad Competition Buggy

References

External links
 

Durango
Durango